"Long Live Rock" is a 1972 single by The Who, written by Pete Townshend. A different version of the song was performed by Billy Fury's character in the film That'll Be the Day (a film which featured Who drummer Keith Moon).  

The original Who recording of the song was not released until the 1974 rarities album Odds & Sods.  It was subsequently released as a single in 1979.

Background
"Long Live Rock" was to have been included in Rock Is Dead—Long Live Rock!, a 1972 Who album which was also to have had an accompanying television special, before the album was shelved. Pete Townshend said of the song:

The lyrics of the song describe a concert at the Rainbow Theatre.

Release
Following its appearance on Odds & Sods, the song saw a 1974 single release in Israel, Italy (where it was backed with "Pure and Easy") and Japan (where it was backed with "Put the Money Down"). "Long Live Rock" also was featured during the credits of the seminal 1979 Who documentary, The Kids Are Alright. Following this appearance, the song was released as a single in Britain, America, and many other countries. The single reached number 48 in Britain, as well as number 54 on the Billboard Hot 100 and number 66 on the Cashbox charts.

A live version recorded by The Who at the BBC was released on their album BBC Sessions.

References

1974 singles
The Who songs
Songs written by Pete Townshend
1972 songs
Track Records singles
Polydor Records singles
Songs about rock music